Radmila "Tina" Ivanović (born 28 September 1973) is a Serbian turbo-folk singer. Born in Kosovska Kamenica, at fourteen years of age she won Prvi glas pomoravlja singing festival in Batočina. Ivanović started her recording career in 1998, but gained popularity upon releasing her third album under Grand Production in 2004.

Tina appeared in the third series of reality show Farma in 2010, but eventually decided to voluntarily leave the competition.

Discography
Studio album
 Lutalica (1998)
 Zavodnica (2000)
 Bunda od nerca (2004)
 Extra (2006)
 Miris Ljubavi (2008)

See also
 Music of Serbia
 List of singers from Serbia
 Turbo-folk

References

External links
 
 
 

1973 births
Living people
People from Kamenica, Kosovo
Kosovo Serbs
21st-century Serbian women singers
Serbian folk-pop singers
Kosovan singers
Grand Production artists